The 1870 Nottingham by-election was fought on 24 February 1870.  The by-election was fought due to the resignation of the incumbent MP of the Conservative Party, Charles Ichabod Wright.  It was won by the Liberal candidate Auberon Herbert.

References

1870 elections in the United Kingdom
1870 in England
19th century in Nottingham
Elections in Nottingham
By-elections to the Parliament of the United Kingdom in Nottinghamshire constituencies